Nebria molendai is a species of black coloured ground beetle in the Nebriinae subfamily that is endemic to Rolwaling valley, Nepal.

References

molendai
Beetles described in 2007
Beetles of Asia
Endemic fauna of Nepal